Chantal Abgottspon (born 1 September 1990) is a Swiss canoeist who won eight medals at individual senior level at the Wildwater Canoeing World Championships and European Wildwater Championships.

References

External links
 

1990 births
Living people
Swiss female canoeists
Place of birth missing (living people)